Carmen Elisa Kuong Mavila (born 18 March 1981) is a Peruvian former footballer who played as a centre back. She has been a member of the Peru women's national team.

International career
Kuong capped for Peru at senior level during the 2003 South American Women's Football Championship.

References

1981 births
Living people
Peruvian women's footballers
Peru women's international footballers
Women's association football central defenders
Peruvian people of Chinese descent
Sportspeople of Chinese descent